Tarzan and the Lion Man is a novel by American writer Edgar Rice Burroughs, the seventeenth in his series of twenty-four books about the title character Tarzan. The novel was originally serialized in the magazine Liberty from November 1933 through January 1934.

It satirizes Hollywood's treatment of the Tarzan character and even spoofs Burroughs' own work. It was written at a time when Johnny Weissmuller was becoming a movie star by playing Tarzan as an illiterate character, to Burroughs' open displeasure.

Plot summary
Tarzan and his lion companion Jad-bal-ja discover a mad scientist with a city of talking gorillas. To create additional havoc, a Hollywood film crew sets out to shoot a Tarzan movie in Africa and brings along an actor who is an exact double of the apeman, but is his opposite in courage and determination.

Later, as John Clayton, Tarzan visits Hollywood to find himself in a screen test for a role in a Tarzan movie. He is deemed unsuitable for the lead role because he is "not the type."

Comic adaptations
The book has been adapted into comic form by Gold Key Comics in Tarzan no. 206, dated February 1972, with a script by Gaylord DuBois and art by Paul Norris, and  later by DC Comics in Tarzan nos. 231-234, dated July 1974-January 1975, adapted by Joe Kubert.

Sources

External links
 
 ERBzine.com Illustrated Bibliography entry for Edgar Rice Burroughs' Tarzan and the Lion Man
Edgar Rice Burroughs Summary Project page for Tarzan and the Lion Man
Text of the novel at Project Gutenberg Australia 

1934 American novels
1934 fantasy novels
Books about lions
Novels first published in serial form
Tarzan novels by Edgar Rice Burroughs
Works originally published in Liberty (general interest magazine)